Hiten Dalal (born 25 September 1994) is an Indian cricketer. He made his List A debut for Delhi in the 2017–18 Vijay Hazare Trophy on 5 February 2018. He made his first-class debut for Delhi in the 2018–19 Ranji Trophy on 12 November 2018. He was the leading run-scorer for Delhi in the tournament, with 376 runs in seven matches. He made his Twenty20 debut for Delhi in the 2018–19 Syed Mushtaq Ali Trophy on 21 February 2019.

References

External links
 

1994 births
Living people
Indian cricketers
Cricketers from Delhi
Delhi cricketers